Davies and Metcalfe Ltd is a railway equipment and locomotive manufacturer from Romiley, Manchester, England. It was founded in Aberystwyth in 1878. The company is now part of Sabwabco Davies & Metcalfe Ltd of Leek, Staffordshire.

History

Rheidol Foundry
James Metcalfe (1847–1920) was apprenticed to Sharp Stewart and worked for the company until 1867 before joining the Manchester and Milford Railway at Aberystwyth as locomotive foreman. Between 1875 and 1877 he took out three patents for an improved exhaust steam injector for steam locomotives and developed it with the financial support of David Davies "Llandinam" and Edward Hamer, the General Manager of the Manchester & Milford Railway. The Patent Exhaust Steam Injector Company was established at the Rheidol Foundry, Aberystwyth in April 1878.

Davies and Metcalfe
The company later moved to Romiley in the Metropolitan Borough of Stockport, Greater Manchester and changed its name to Davies and Metcalfe. It produced a range of locomotive engineering products including lubricators, exhaust steam injectors, vacuum brake ejectors etc. They also manufacture the pneumatic disc brake systems used on modern trains including the V/Line Sprinter and British Rail Class 56.

Locomotives

The company built two  locomotives for the  gauge Vale of Rheidol Railway at Aberystwyth in 1902. They also renovated two locomotives for the North Wales Narrow Gauge Railway in 1902 (Snowdon Ranger) and 1903 Moel Tryfan).

Metcalfe-Oerlikon
Davies and Metcalfe had an arrangement with Oerlikon and sold railway air brake equipment under the name Metcalfe-Oerlikon. This was fitted to some British Railways diesel locomotives, e.g., Classes 45 and 46.

Notes

References
Richard Metcalfe. Davies & Metcalfe Ltd: railway engineers to the world. 1999. 208 pp. 142 illus.

Locomotive manufacturers of the United Kingdom
Companies established in 1878